These are lists of Bulgarian military aircraft:

 List of active Bulgarian military aircraft
 List of former Bulgarian military aircraft

Bulgarian Air Force
Lists of military aircraft
Aircraft